Voltido is a comune (municipality) in the Province of Cremona in the Italian region Lombardy, located about  southeast of Milan and about  east of Cremona.

Voltido borders the following municipalities: Ca' d'Andrea, Drizzona, Piadena, San Martino del Lago, Solarolo Rainerio, Torre de' Picenardi.

References

Cities and towns in Lombardy